Henricus Adrianus "Harry" Broos (25 May 1898 – 16 July 1954) was a Dutch sprinter, who competed in the 100 m, 200 m, 400 m, 4 × 100 m and 4 × 400 m events at the 1924 and 1928 Summer Olympics. He won a bronze medal in the 4 × 100 m relay in 1924 and failed to reach the finals on all other occasions.

Broos won 12 Dutch national titles, at 100 m, 200 m and 400 m as well as one at the long jump.

Football career
Besides running, between 1922 and 1925 Broos played 23 football matches for PSV Eindhoven. After retiring from competitions he worked as a football administrator at PSV. He also played football for UVV in Utrecht after joining them from hometown club Alliance in 1920.

Personal life
Broos was married to Nelly Ligthart, who was a daughter of PSV administrator Harrie Lighthart.

References

External links

 PSV Atletiek
 databaseolympics.com

1898 births
1954 deaths
Sportspeople from Roosendaal
Dutch footballers
Dutch male sprinters
Athletes (track and field) at the 1924 Summer Olympics
Athletes (track and field) at the 1928 Summer Olympics
Olympic athletes of the Netherlands
Olympic bronze medalists for the Netherlands
Medalists at the 1924 Summer Olympics
Olympic bronze medalists in athletics (track and field)
PSV Eindhoven players
Association footballers not categorized by position